Kanan Yusif-zada (Kanan Raphael oghlu Yusif-zada) is an Azerbaijani surgeon, a professor of Azerbaijan National Academy of Sciences, an Honorary Doctor, past-Head of the Military Medical Division of the State Border Service (Azerbaijan), Colonel of Medical Services and a member of international medical organizations.

Early life 
Kanan Yusif-zada was born in Gakh, Azerbaijan on June 28, 1973.

He started his primary education in Khutul, Mongolia. Later he came to Azerbaijan and completed his secondary education at the gymnasium of physics and mathematics in Sumgayit with a "Silver" medal.

In 1990, he started his undergraduate education at Azerbaijan Medical University and graduated from this faculty in 1996 with honors.

During 1996-1998, he studied General Surgery at Azerbaijan Medical University.

During 1998–2004, he completed his Residency in General Surgery of Gazi University in Ankara, Turkey.

In 2004, he protected scientific work under the name “Role of Anandamide at mesenteric ischemia-reperfusion” and was awarded the title of Ph.D. in Medicine.

In 2004, he carried out research work in the framework of the Scientific and Technological Research Council of Turkey (TUBITAK) sponsored NATO-PC "B" scholarship program in Ankara, Turkey and earned the highest qualification (Gastroenterology and Invasive Endoscopy) certificate.

In 2004 he completed research work within the NATO-PC "B" scholarship program supported by TUBITAK in Ankara, Turkey, and received a certificate of higher specialization (Gastroenterology and Invasive Endoscopy).

In 2008, he started Research Fellowship in the Department of Colorectal Surgery in Cleveland Clinic in the United States, and that December worked as visitor physician at the Department of General Surgery and Kidney and Pancreas Transplantation at Mayo Clinic.

He enrolled in the MBA program at the Maastricht School of Management in the Netherlands from 2013 to 2015 and earned an Executive MBA at the ADA University in Azerbaijan from 2013 to 2016.

In 2016, he defended the Ph.D. thesis on "Minimally invasive interventions in pathologies of extrahepatic biliar system structures".

Career 
He specializes in General Surgery, Military Medicine, Gastroenterology and Surgical Endoscopy, Brest and Endocrine Surgery, Hepatopancreatobiliary Surgery, Colorectal Surgery, Kidney Transplantation, Military Trauma, Business Management.

Medical work 
Kanan Yusif-zada gained his first medical experience in 1991–1996 as a senior preparator in the department of "Operative surgery and topographic anatomy" of Azerbaijan Medical University. Later he worked at the division of clinical ordinatura there.

 Chief of Department of Surgery in City Hospital, Baku (2004-2005)
 Chief of Department of Endoscopic Surgery and Diagnostics in Central Hospital of Oil Workers (2005-2010)
 Head of the State Border Service (Azerbaijan) Military Hospital (2010-2020)
 Head of the Military Medical Division of the State Border Service of the Republic of Azerbaijan (2020-2021)
 General Surgeon and Gastroenterologist at "Leyla Medical Center" (from 11.2021 up to now)

In 2016 he began working as a Professor teaching Fundamentals of Medical Aid in Civil Defense at the Department of Chemical Engineering in Baku Higher Oil School.

In 2022 - teaches "Innovation and project management in medicine" at the UNEC, Azerbaijan State University of Economics

Presidium of the Azerbaijan National Academy of Sciences elected Yusif-zada Kanan Rafael - Professor of the Azerbaijan National Academy of Sciences by the decision dated July 17, 2019.

Societies 

 Turkish Association for Endoscopic Laparoscopic Surgery (from 2004 to the present)
 Russian Society of Surgeons-Gastroenterologists (from 2006 to the present)
 Turkish-Azerbaijani Endoscopic Surgeons Association, founder and chairman  (2007-2018)
 European Renal Association – European Dialysis and Transplant Association (from 2007 to the present)
 International Society of Surgery (from 2008 to the present)
 Society of American Gastrointestinal and Endoscopic Surgeons (from 2009 to the present)
 European Association for Transluminal Surgery (from 2009 to the present)
 Ambroise Paré International Military Surgery Forum (from 2011 to the present)
 American College of Surgeons (from 2016 to the present)
 Turkish Thoracic Surgery Society (from 2015 to the present) 
 Russian Society of Surgeons (from 2016 to the present)
 Ambroise Paré International Military Surgery Forum (President, 2017-2019)
 Association of Military Surgeons, founder and chairman (from 2018 to the present)
 Editorial board of “Новости хирургии” (Belarus), Clinical Case and Frontier Surgery magazines

Research 
Author of 1 invention, 1 working model, 6 books, more than 100 scientific articles, and thesis.

Reviewer in such publications as "Clinical Case Reports", "Frontiers", a member of the editorial board of the journal "News of Surgery" (Belarus) and a member of the International Advisory Board of Fujita Medical Journal (Japan).

Books 

 2002: General Surgery (in Turkish), co-author.
 2005: Gynecologic and Obstetrical Surgery (in English), Ventral Abdominal Hernias, and Malign and Benign diseases of breast (two chapters)
 2011: Gastrointestinal Endoscopy (in Azerbaijani), Baku, Azerbaijan.
 2012: Surgical Endoscopy (in Azerbaijani), Baku, Azerbaijan.
 2016: Semi-Public Hospital Management (in English), Baku, Azerbaijan.
 2017: Fundamentals of Civil Defense and Medical Aid (in English), Baku, Azerbaijan.
 2018: Military-Medical Explanatory Dictionary, Baku, Azerbaijan.
 2022: Comprehensive Explanatory Dictionary of Medical Terms (in Azerbaijani), Baku, Azerbaijan.

Recognition 

 2006: Taraggi Medal, by the decree of the President of the Republic of Azerbaijan.
 2007: Academician Yusif Mammadaliyev Medal, by "Bilik" Center of Education, Culture, and Information of the Republic of Azerbaijan.
 2011–2016: 5 medals by the head of State Border Service (Azerbaijan).
 2011: Third Degree Medal for Distinguished Military Service.
 2013: Jubilee Medal for the 95th Anniversary of the Azerbaijani Armed Forces.
 2014: Jubilee Medal for the 95th anniversary of the State Border Service (Azerbaijan).
 2015: Third Degree Medal for Distinguished Military Service.
 2016: For military services medal, by the decree of the President of the Republic of Azerbaijan.
 2017: Honorary title "Honorary Doctor", by the decree of the President of the Republic of Azerbaijan.
 2018: Michael E. Debakey International Military Surgeons' Award.
 2019: "100th anniversary of the Border Guard of the Republic of Azerbaijan (1919-2019)" anniversary medal.
 2020: The Order "For Merit to the Fatherland", III class for his work as a doctor-surgeon in the 44-day Patriotic War (by order of the President of the Republic of Azerbaijan).

Patents 

 “Method of treatment of peritonitis” registered by the State Committee of Science and Technology of the Republic of Azerbaijan in the state register in 18.12.98 (P 980095);
 “Laparoscopic Trainer” registered by the State Committee of Standardization, Metrology and Patent of Azerbaijan Republic in 05.11.2014 (F20140011)

References 

Azerbaijani surgeons
Azerbaijan Medical University alumni
1973 births
Living people